Arumugam Kandaiah Premachandran (born 8 November 1957; commonly known as Suresh Premachandran) is a Sri Lankan Tamil militant turned politician and former Member of Parliament. He is the current leader of the Eelam People's Revolutionary Liberation Front (EPRLF), a member of the Tamil National Alliance (TNA).

Early life
Premachandran was born on 8 November 1957, the son of a farmer. He was educated at Uruthirapuram Maha Vidyalayam and Senguntha Hindu College. He then joined Waterloo College, London and Madras Christian College where he studied political science.

Premachandran got involved in the Sri Lankan Tamil nationalism movement whilst at school and in 1976, whilst in London, he joined the Eelam Revolutionary Organisation of Students (EROS). He received military training from the Palestinians in Lebanon. In 1979 K. Pathmanabha left EROS to form the Eelam People's Revolutionary Liberation Front (EPRLF) and Premachandran joined him. He took on the nom de guerre Suresh and was a member of the EPRLF's central committee and politburo. Premachandran took on the leadership of EPRLF following the assassination of Pathmanabha by the Liberation Tigers of Tamil Eelam on 19 June 1990.

Career
Premachandran was one of the ENDLF/EPRLF/TELO/TULF alliance's candidates in Jaffna District at the 1989 parliamentary election. He was elected and entered Parliament.

On 20 October 2001 the All Ceylon Tamil Congress, EPRLF, Tamil Eelam Liberation Organization and Tamil United Liberation Front formed the Tamil National Alliance (TNA). He contested the 2001 parliamentary election as one of the TNA's candidates in Jaffna District but failed to get elected.

Premachandran contested the 2004 parliamentary election as one of the TNA's candidates in Jaffna District. He was elected and re-entered Parliament. He was re-elected at the 2010 parliamentary election. He failed to get re-elected at the 2015 parliamentary election after coming seventh amongst the TNA candidates.

Electoral history

References

External links

1957 births
Living people
Eelam People's Revolutionary Liberation Front militants
Eelam People's Revolutionary Liberation Front politicians
Eelam Revolutionary Organisation of Students militants
Members of the 9th Parliament of Sri Lanka
Members of the 13th Parliament of Sri Lanka
Members of the 14th Parliament of Sri Lanka
Sri Lankan Hindus
Sri Lankan Tamil politicians
Sri Lankan Tamil rebels
Tamil National Alliance politicians